= Anerneq =

Anerneq is a Native American mythological figure of the Alaska Natives people. It is the part of the soul which departs the body to go to the underworld after death. It is distinct from the Tarneq, the opposite aspect of the soul.
